The Persijn Estate (Persijn landgoed) in Maartensdijk is an estate with a white villa just west of the A27 motorway.

The estate dates from 1781 and was originally designed as an early English landscape garden. In the 19th century it was renewed in the late landscape style with two tree-lined avenues and the introduction of exotic plants.

The pedagogy center OPL has established her headquarters here and also houses three living units for maladjusted youth.

The villa and the gardener's house are Rijksmonuments.

References

Landgoed Persijn - Marlies van Diest ontwerp
Rijksmonument nr. http://monumentenregister.cultureelerfgoed.nl/php/main.php?cAction=search&sCompMonNr=517563|label=517563 and https://web.archive.org/web/20150415060815/http://monumentenregister.cultureelerfgoed.nl/php/main.php?cAction=search&sCompMonNr=517564

Buildings and structures completed in 1781
Rijksmonuments in Utrecht (province)